Matthew Ball (born 26 March 1993) is a Northern Irish footballer who currently plays for Hendon, where he plays as a winger.

Ball started his career with Norwich City in 2005, and progressed through the ranks at the club to sign his first professional contract in May 2011. During the 2011–12 season, Ball was loaned out to Macclesfield Town. He was released by Norwich in June 2012, and signed for Stevenage a month later. Ball spent a month out on loan at Farnborough in March 2013. He has also represented Northern Ireland at various youth levels.

Club career

Norwich City
Ball began his career at Norwich City, joining the club at the age of twelve and progressing through the various youth ranks. He captained the academy side during the 2010–11 season, and also played regularly for the reserves, scoring eight goals in 14 matches. He was called up to the first-team in October 2010, and was named as a substitute in Norwich's 2–1 home defeat to Crystal Palace, although he did not feature. In the summer of 2011, as a second-year scholar, Ball signed his first professional contract with Norwich, a one-year deal. On offering Ball the contract, Norwich manager Paul Lambert stated — "It's a chance for him to see if he can handle playing with the professionals. Every time he has trained with us he has not let us down at all". The following season, having again played regularly for Norwich's second-string but made no first-team appearances, Ball was loaned out to League Two side Macclesfield Town in March 2012, on a one-month loan agreement. However, he did not play during the brief loan spell, and returned to Norwich to see out the remainder of the 2011–12 campaign. At the end of the season, Ball was released by Norwich, having made no first-team appearances for the club.

Stevenage
Ahead of the 2012–13 season, Ball went on trial at League One side Stevenage. It proved to be successful, and he subsequently signed for the club on 19 July 2012, joining on a two-year contract. He did not make any first-team appearances for Stevenage during the first half of the season, and, in February 2013, was loaned out to Conference South side Farnborough on a one-month deal. Ball made seven appearances during the loan spell, scoring once in Farnborough's 1–0 away win over Eastbourne Borough. He returned to Stevenage, and made his first senior appearance for the club on 20 April 2013, coming on as a 75th-minute substitute in a 3–0 away defeat to Swindon Town.

On 17 May 2014, Ball was released by Stevenage.

Biggleswade Town
Ball signed for Biggleswade Town on 22 May 2018.

Hendon
Ball signed for Hendon in July 2020 .

International career
Ball has represented Northern Ireland at U17, U19 and U21 level.

Personal life
Ball was born in Welwyn Garden City, Hertfordshire. His father, Tim, also played for Stevenage, for three years from 1984 to 1987. His brother Dominic is also a footballer and is currently contracted to Queens Park Rangers.

Career statistics

A.  The "League" column constitutes appearances and goals (including those as a substitute) in Conference South and the Football League.

References

External links

Matt Ball at NIFG

1993 births
Living people
Sportspeople from Welwyn Garden City
Northern Ireland youth international footballers
English footballers
English people of Northern Ireland descent
Norwich City F.C. players
Macclesfield Town F.C. players
Stevenage F.C. players
Farnborough F.C. players
Boreham Wood F.C. players
Wealdstone F.C. players
St Albans City F.C. players
Hendon F.C. players
Biggleswade Town F.C. players
English Football League players
National League (English football) players
Isthmian League players
Association football wingers